The Afro-Brazilian and Indigenous History and Culture Law (Law No. 11.645/2008) is a Brazilian law mandating the teaching of Afro-Brazilian and Indigenous History and Culture which was passed and entered into effectiveness on March 10, 2008. It amends Law No. 9.394, of December 20, 1996, modified by Law No. 10.639, of January 9, 2003, which established the guidelines and bases of Brazilian national education, to include in the official curriculum of the education system the mandatory theme of Afro-Brazilian and Indigenous History and Culture.

Text 
The Law reads (unofficial translation):

Art. 1 Art. 26-A of Law 9.394, of December 20, 1996, becomes effective with the following wording:

Art. 26-A. In public and private primary and secondary schools, the study of Afro-Brazilian and indigenous history and culture is mandatory.

§ 1 The syllabus referred to in this article will include several aspects of history and culture that characterize the formation of the Brazilian population, based on these two ethnic groups, such as the study of the history of Africa and Africans, the struggle of blacks and of the indigenous peoples in Brazil, the black and indigenous Brazilian culture and the black and the indigenous in the formation of the national society, rescuing their contributions in the social, economic and political areas, pertinent to the history of Brazil.

§ 2 The contents referring to Afro-Brazilian history and culture and that of Brazilian indigenous peoples will be taught within the entire school curriculum, especially in the areas of artistic education and Brazilian literature and history.

Reception 
The main criticisms of Law No. 11.645/2008 focus on its effective implementation within the various levels of the education system in Brazil's states in terms of curriculum planning and materials development, together with the degree of authenticity of the incorporation of the perspectives of the Afro-Brazilian and indigenous peoples themselves.

See also 

 Anti-discrimination laws in Brazil
 Indigenous peoples in Brazil
 Law of Brazil

References

External links 

 Law No. 11.645/2008 on the official website of the President of the Republic

Law of Brazil
Brazilian public law
Brazilian culture
Indigenous culture in Brazil
Afro-Brazilian culture
Indigenous education
Education in Brazil